Charlotte Saumaise de Chazan (1619–1684), also spelled Saumaize de Chazan and also known as Madame de Brégy, was a poet, one of the Précieuses and lady in waiting to Queen Anne of Austria.

Biography
Charlotte Saumaise de Chazan was born in Paris in 1619, the daughter of a secretary to Gaston, Duke of Orléans, Bégnine de Saumaise and one of the queen's maids, Marguerite Anne Hébert. Her uncle was also the scientist Claude Saumaise and it was he who looked after her education until Marie de Medici took over.

She was married at the age of 14 to Lieutenant General Nicolas de Flécelles, Count de Brégy. de Chazan had a number of pregnancies which gave her four children, Anne-Marie, Élisabeth, Jean-Baptiste and Léonor. Her husband was away for most of their marriage. de Chazan was granted a separation of property(1651) and of body (1673). Her legal cases around this divorce created huge discussions among the Salon circles about the obligation of women to marry and bear children. The stories published at the time about women who left their families behind fueled several books. de Chazan left everything to Elisabeth.

De Chazan was a poet, known amongst the Précieuses as Belarmis and Belinde. She was occasionally employed to write verses by Louis XIV while she worked as Lady in waiting to Queen Anne of Austria. de Chazon wrote with the great names of Europe including to the Queens of England and particularly with Christina of Sweden, the Countess of Soissons, the Archbishop of Paris, and Monsieur, younger brother of the King of France. When the Queen died in 1666, de Chazon remained close to Philippe d'Orléans. She was included in the collection of verbal portraits gathered by Mademoiselle de Montpensier in 1659 and composed epigrams with Henriette de Coligny de La Suze. She died at the Palais-Royal on 13 April 1684 and was buried with her husband at St Gervais.

Bibliography
La Sphère de la lune composée de la tête de la femme (1992)
Lettres et poésies de Madame la Comtesse de Brégy (1668)
Les Œuvres galantes de Madame la comtesse de B. (de Brégy.) (1667)
Les Lettres et poésies de Madame la Comtesse de B. (1666)
La Sphere de la lune, composée de la teste de la femme (1658)
Les Lettres et poésies with Charlotte Saumaize de Chazan Brégy (comtesse de, 1619-1693) as Autre
Cinq Questions d'amour, proposées par Madame de Brégy, avec la réponse en vers par M. Quinault, par l'ordre du Roy
Le Point du Jour, Air, gracieusement. (1770)

References and sources

1619 births

1684 deaths
17th-century French poets
French women poets